The following is an alphabetical list of articles related to the U.S. state of Wisconsin.

0–9 

.wi.us – Internet second-level domain for the state of Wisconsin
30th State to join the United States of America

A
Adjacent states:

Agriculture in Wisconsin
Airports in Wisconsin
Amusement parks in Wisconsin
Arboreta in Wisconsin
commons:Category:Arboreta in Wisconsin
Archaeology in Wisconsin
:Category:Archaeological sites in Wisconsin
commons:Category:Archaeological sites in Wisconsin
Architecture in Wisconsin
Area codes in Wisconsin
Art museums and galleries in Wisconsin
commons:Category:Art museums and galleries in Wisconsin
Astronomical observatories in Wisconsin
commons:Category:Astronomical observatories in Wisconsin
Wisconsin State Assembly
Attorney General of the State of Wisconsin
Axley Brynelson, LLP

B

Badger Army Ammunition Plant
Bannered highway routes in Wisconsin
Beer
Belmont, Wisconsin, territorial capital 1836-1837
Botanical gardens in Wisconsin
commons:Category:Botanical gardens in Wisconsin
Buildings and structures in Wisconsin
commons:Category:Buildings and structures in Wisconsin

C

Capital of the State of Wisconsin
Capitol of the State of Wisconsin
commons:Category:Wisconsin State Capitol
Casinos in Wisconsin
Caves of Wisconsin
commons:Category:Caves of Wisconsin
Cheese
Census statistical areas of Wisconsin
Chicago-Naperville-Joliet, IL-IN-WI Metropolitan Statistical Area
Chicago-Naperville-Michigan City, IL-IN-WI Combined Statistical Area
Cities in Wisconsin
commons:Category:Cities in Wisconsin
Civil War regiments from Wisconsin
Climate change in Wisconsin 
Climate of Wisconsin
:Category:Climate of Wisconsin
commons:Category:Climate of Wisconsin
Colleges and universities in Wisconsin
commons:Category:Universities and colleges in Wisconsin
Communications in Wisconsin
commons:Category:Communications in Wisconsin
Companies in Wisconsin
Congressional districts of Wisconsin
Constitution of the State of Wisconsin
Convention centers in Wisconsin
commons:Category:Convention centers in Wisconsin
Counties of the State of Wisconsin
commons:Category:Counties in Wisconsin
County Executives in Wisconsin
County trunk highways in Wisconsin
Culture of Wisconsin
commons:Category:Wisconsin culture

D
Wisconsin dairy industry
Democratic Party of Wisconsin
Demographics of Wisconsin
List of dry communities by U.S. state § Wisconsin

E
Economy of Wisconsin
:Category:Economy of Wisconsin
commons:Category:Economy of Wisconsin
Education in Wisconsin
:Category:Education in Wisconsin
commons:Category:Education in Wisconsin
Elections in the State of Wisconsin
:Category:Wisconsin elections
commons:Category:Wisconsin elections
Environment of Wisconsin
commons:Category:Environment of Wisconsin

F

Festivals in Wisconsin
commons:Category:Festivals in Wisconsin
Flag of the State of Wisconsin
Football
Forts in Wisconsin
:Category:Forts in Wisconsin
commons:Category:Forts in Wisconsin

G

Geography of Wisconsin
:Category:Geography of Wisconsin
commons:Category:Geography of Wisconsin
Geology of Wisconsin
commons:Category:Geology of Wisconsin
Gun laws in Wisconsin
Ghost towns in Wisconsin
:Category:Ghost towns in Wisconsin
commons:Category:Ghost towns in Wisconsin
Golf clubs and courses in Wisconsin
Government of the State of Wisconsin  website
:Category:Government of Wisconsin
commons:Category:Government of Wisconsin
Governor of the State of Wisconsin
List of governors of Wisconsin
Great Seal of the State of Wisconsin
Green Bay Packers

H

Harley-Davidson Motor Company, Milwaukee
Heritage railroads in Wisconsin
commons:Category:Heritage railroads in Wisconsin
High schools of Wisconsin
Higher education in Wisconsin
Hiking trails in Wisconsin
commons:Category:Hiking trails in Wisconsin
History of Wisconsin
Historical outline of Wisconsin
:Category:History of Wisconsin
commons:Category:History of Wisconsin
Hospitals in Wisconsin
Housing in Wisconsin
Category:Housing in Wisconsin

I
Images of Wisconsin
commons:Category:Wisconsin
Islands of Wisconsin

J

K
Kettle Moraine Scenic Drive

L

Lakes of Wisconsin
Lake Michigan
Lake Superior
commons:Category:Lakes of Wisconsin
Landforms of Wisconsin
Landmarks in Wisconsin
commons:Category:Landmarks in Wisconsin
Libertarian Party of Wisconsin
Lighthouses in Wisconsin
Lieutenant Governor of the State of Wisconsin
Lists related to the State of Wisconsin:
List of airports in Wisconsin
List of census statistical areas in Wisconsin
List of birds of Wisconsin
List of cities in Wisconsin
List of Civil War regiments from Wisconsin
List of colleges and universities in Wisconsin
List of counties in Wisconsin
List of dams and reservoirs in Wisconsin
List of forts in Wisconsin
List of ghost towns in Wisconsin
List of governors of Wisconsin
List of high schools in Wisconsin
List of hospitals in Wisconsin
List of islands of Wisconsin
List of lakes in Wisconsin
List of law enforcement agencies in Wisconsin
List of lieutenant governors of Wisconsin
List of museums in Wisconsin
List of National Historic Landmarks in Wisconsin
List of newspapers in Wisconsin
List of people from Wisconsin
List of power stations in Wisconsin
List of radio stations in Wisconsin
List of railroads in Wisconsin
List of Registered Historic Places in Wisconsin
List of rivers of Wisconsin
List of school districts in Wisconsin
List of state forests in Wisconsin
List of state parks in Wisconsin
List of state prisons in Wisconsin
List of symbols of the State of Wisconsin
List of telephone area codes in Wisconsin
List of television shows set in Wisconsin
List of television stations in Wisconsin
List of towns in Wisconsin
List of United States congressional delegations from Wisconsin
List of United States congressional districts in Wisconsin
List of United States representatives from Wisconsin
List of United States senators from Wisconsin
List of villages in Wisconsin

M

Madison, Wisconsin, territorial and state capital since 1838
Maps of Wisconsin
commons:Category:Maps of Wisconsin
Mass media in Wisconsin
Milwaukee, Wisconsin
Mississippi River
Monuments and memorials in Wisconsin
commons:Category:Monuments and memorials in Wisconsin
Museums in Wisconsin
:Category:Museums in Wisconsin
commons:Category:Museums in Wisconsin
Music of Wisconsin
:Category:Music of Wisconsin
commons:Category:Music of Wisconsin
:Category:Musical groups from Wisconsin
:Category:Musicians from Wisconsin

N

National Forests of Wisconsin
commons:Category:National Forests of Wisconsin
Native American tribes in Wisconsin
Natural arches of Wisconsin
commons:Category:Natural arches of Wisconsin
Natural gas pipelines in Wisconsin
National Historic Landmarks in Wisconsin
Natural history of Wisconsin
commons:Category:Natural history of Wisconsin
The New North
Newspapers of Wisconsin

O
Outdoor sculptures in Wisconsin
commons:Category:Outdoor sculptures in Wisconsin

P
People from Wisconsin
:Category:People from Wisconsin
commons:Category:People from Wisconsin
:Category:People by city in Wisconsin
:Category:People by county in Wisconsin
:Category:People from Wisconsin by occupation
Politics of Wisconsin
commons:Category:Politics of Wisconsin
Democratic Party of Wisconsin
Libertarian Party of Wisconsin
Republican Party of Wisconsin
Social-Democratic Party of Wisconsin
Power stations in Wisconsin
Protected areas of Wisconsin
commons:Category:Protected areas of Wisconsin

Q

R
Radio stations in Wisconsin
Railroad museums in Wisconsin
commons:Category:Railroad museums in Wisconsin
Railroads in Wisconsin
Registered historic places in Wisconsin
commons:Category:Registered Historic Places in Wisconsin
Religion in Wisconsin
:Category:Religion in Wisconsin
commons:Category:Religion in Wisconsin
Repopulation of wolves in Midwestern United States
Republican Party of Wisconsin
Rivers of Wisconsin
commons:Category:Rivers of Wisconsin
Rock formations in Wisconsin
commons:Category:Rock formations in Wisconsin
Rustic roads in Wisconsin

S
School districts of Wisconsin
Scouting in Wisconsin
Wisconsin State Senate
Settlements in Wisconsin
Former settlements in Wisconsin
Cities in Wisconsin
Towns in Wisconsin
Villages in Wisconsin
Census Designated Places in Wisconsin
Former Census Designated Places in Wisconsin
Other unincorporated communities in Wisconsin
List of ghost towns in Wisconsin
Ski areas and resorts in Wisconsin
commons:Category:Ski areas and resorts in Wisconsin
Social-Democratic Party of Wisconsin
Solar power in Wisconsin
Sports in Wisconsin
:Category:Sports in Wisconsin
commons:Category:Sports in Wisconsin
:Category:Sports venues in Wisconsin
commons:Category:Sports venues in Wisconsin
State Capitol of Wisconsin

State highway routes in Wisconsin
State of Wisconsin  website
Constitution of the State of Wisconsin
Government of the State of Wisconsin
:Category:Government of Wisconsin
commons:Category:Government of Wisconsin
Executive branch of the government of the State of Wisconsin
Governor of the State of Wisconsin
Legislative branch of the government of the State of Wisconsin
Legislature of the State of Wisconsin
Wisconsin State Senate
Wisconsin State Assembly
Judicial branch of the government of the State of Wisconsin
Supreme Court of the State of Wisconsin
State Trunk Highway System
Interstate Highways in Wisconsin
U.S. Highways in Wisconsin
State Trunk Highways in Wisconsin
"Bannered" highways
State parks of Wisconsin
commons:Category:State parks of Wisconsin
State Patrol of Wisconsin
State prisons of Wisconsin
Structures in Wisconsin
commons:Category:Buildings and structures in Wisconsin
Supreme Court of the State of Wisconsin
Symbols of the State of Wisconsin
:Category:Symbols of Wisconsin
commons:Category:Symbols of Wisconsin

T

Taliesin, Spring Green
Telecommunications in Wisconsin
commons:Category:Communications in Wisconsin
Telephone area codes in Wisconsin
Television shows set in Wisconsin
Television stations in Wisconsin
Territory of Wisconsin
Theatres in Wisconsin
commons:Category:Theatres in Wisconsin
Tourism in Wisconsin  website
commons:Category:Tourism in Wisconsin
Towns in Wisconsin
commons:Category:Cities in Wisconsin
Transportation in Wisconsin
:Category:Transportation in Wisconsin
commons:Category:Transport in Wisconsin

U
United States of America
States of the United States of America
United States census statistical areas of Wisconsin
United States congressional delegations from Wisconsin
United States congressional districts in Wisconsin
United States Court of Appeals for the Seventh Circuit
United States District Court for the Eastern District of Wisconsin
United States District Court for the Western District of Wisconsin
United States representatives from Wisconsin
United States senators from Wisconsin
Universities and colleges in Wisconsin
commons:Category:Universities and colleges in Wisconsin
U.S. highway routes in Wisconsin
US-WI – ISO 3166-2:US region code for the State of Wisconsin

V
Villages in Wisconsin

W

Water parks in Wisconsin
Waterfalls of Wisconsin
commons:Category:Waterfalls of Wisconsin
WI – United States Postal Service postal code for the State of Wisconsin
Wikimedia
Wikimedia Commons:Category:Wisconsin
commons:Category:Maps of Wisconsin
Wikinews:Category:Wisconsin
Wikinews:Portal:Wisconsin
Wikipedia Category:Wisconsin
Wikipedia:WikiProject Wisconsin
:Category:WikiProject Wisconsin articles
:Category:WikiProject Wisconsin participants
Wind power in Wisconsin
Wisconsin  website
:Category:Wisconsin
commons:Category:Wisconsin
commons:Category:Maps of Wisconsin
Wisconsin Bio Industry Alliance
Wisconsin Career Academy
Wisconsin Circuit Court Access
Wisconsin Cream City Chorus
Wisconsin fishing records
Wisconsin General Test Apparatus
Wisconsin Historical Society
Wisconsin Idea
Wisconsin Institute of Certified Public Accountants
Wisconsin Intercollegiate Athletic Conference
Wisconsin Local History Collection
Wisconsin Lutheran School
Wisconsin Manufacturers and Commerce
Wisconsin Ovarian Cancer Alliance
Wisconsin–River Falls Falcons women's ice hockey
Wisconsin Sea Grant
Wisconsin Sports Minute
Wisconsin State Capitol
Wisconsin State Patrol
Wisconsin Virtual Learning
Wisconsin WIC Association
Wright, Frank Lloyd

X

Y

Z
Zoos in Wisconsin
commons:Category:Zoos in Wisconsin

See also

Topic overview:
Wisconsin
Outline of Wisconsin

Wisconsin
 
Wisconsin